James Burton (1784 – 1868) was born in Clitheroe in 1784 and owned several cotton mills in Tyldesley and Hindsford in the middle of the 19th century.

Burton moved to Tildsley Banks in 1828 where he entered into partnership with John and Richard Jones at Tyldesley New Mill but the brothers were more interested in silk weaving and moved to Bedford. By 1838 he owned many properties in the west end of the town, where he lived in Charles Street, and in Hindsford across the Hindsford Brook. In 1845 his firm was named Burton, Chippendale and Company but the partnership was dissolved.

James Burton & Sons was the biggest mill-owning business in the area in the middle of the 19th century. Burton built a cluster of cotton mills in Hindsford starting with  Atherton Mill in 1839, followed by Lodge Mill in 1853, Field Mill in 1856, and Westfield Mill in 1860, all of which were supplied with water by the Hindsford Brook.

Burton was a Liberal. He represented Tyldesley on the Board of Guardians of the Leigh Poor Law Union. He died in 1868 and is buried in St George's churchyard.

After his death, his sons, Oliver and Fred continued the business. A fire at the mills caused £15,000 damage in November 1883. In 1891 Burton's mills had 157,196 spindles and 570 looms. The mills were stripped of machinery and demolished in 1926.

See also
 List of mills in Wigan

References

Notes

Bibliography

Textile manufacturers of England
1784 births
1868 deaths
Companies based in Lancashire